Buchanan is a city and the county seat of Haralson County, Georgia, United States. The population was 1,104 at the 2010 census, up from 941 at the 2000 census.

Locally, the city's name is pronounced Buck-HAN-uhn.

History
Buchanan was founded in 1856 as seat of the newly formed Haralson County. It was named for United States President James Buchanan. Buchanan was incorporated as a town in 1857 and as a city in 1902.

Geography
Buchanan is located just east of the center of Haralson County at  (33.801726, -85.183506). U.S. Route 27 bypasses the city to the east, leading north  to Cedartown and south  to Bremen.

Demographics

2020 census

As of the 2020 United States census, there were 938 people, 436 households, and 274 families residing in the city.

2000 census
As of the census of 2000, there were 941 people, 345 households, and 221 families residing in the city. The racial makeup of the city was 87.14% White, 11.37% African American, 0.11% Native American, 0.11% Asian, 0.11% from other races, and 1.17% from two or more races. Hispanic or Latino of any race were 0.53% of the population.

There were 345 households, out of which 27.0% had children under the age of 18 living with them, 46.1% were married couples living together, 14.8% had a female householder with no husband present, and 35.7% were non-families. 33.6% of all households were made up of individuals, and 17.7% had someone living alone who was 65 years of age or older.  The average household size was 2.38 and the average family size was 3.02.

In the city, the population was spread out, with 22.8% under the age of 18, 8.0% from 18 to 24, 28.5% from 25 to 44, 21.5% from 45 to 64, and 19.2% who were 65 years of age or older.  The median age was 38 years. For every 100 females, there were 96.9 males.  For every 100 females age 18 and over, there were 86.2 males.

The median income for a household in the city was $23,269, and the median income for a family was $26,964. Males had a median income of $24,205 versus $16,458 for females. The per capita income for the city was $11,821.  About 20.5% of families and 22.7% of the population were below the poverty line, including 23.4% of those under age 18 and 19.8% of those age 65 or over.

Education

Haralson County School District 
The Haralson County School District holds pre-school to grade twelve, and consists of four elementary schools, a middle school, and a high school. The district has 231 full-time teachers and over 3,766 students.

Buchanan Elementary School
Buchanan Primary School
Tallapoosa Primary School
West Haralson Elementary School
Haralson County Middle School
Haralson County High School

References

External links
City of Buchanan official website
Buchanan-Haralson Public Library

Cities in Georgia (U.S. state)
Cities in Haralson County, Georgia
County seats in Georgia (U.S. state)